Pseudoedaleosia scoparioides is a moth of the family Noctuidae. It is found in Western Australia.

External links
Australian Faunal Directory

Hadeninae
Moths of Australia